Elanga Buala (21 May 1964 – 7 January 2021) was a sprinter from Papua New Guinea. She competed in the women's 200 metres at the 1984 Summer Olympics in Los Angeles, United States.

References

External links
 

1964 births
2021 deaths
Athletes (track and field) at the 1984 Summer Olympics
Papua New Guinean female sprinters
Olympic athletes of Papua New Guinea
Athletes (track and field) at the 1982 Commonwealth Games
Commonwealth Games competitors for Papua New Guinea
World Athletics Championships athletes for Papua New Guinea
Place of birth missing
Olympic female sprinters